Jared James Llorens is an American academic and public administration official who was appointed to serve as a member of the Federal Salary Council. Llorens is also the dean of the E. J. Ourso College of Business at Louisiana State University.

Early life and education 
Llorens is a native of Baton Rouge, Louisiana. He earned a Bachelor of Arts degree in English from Loyola University New Orleans, a Master of Public Administration from the University of Texas at Austin, and a Doctor of Public Administration from the University of Georgia School of Public and International Affairs.

Career 
Llorens has served as an analyst in the United States Office of Personnel Management and United States Department of Labor. He was the editor-in-chief of Public Personnel Management and a fellow at the National Academy of Public Administration. In 2007, Llorens became an associate professor of public administration at the University of Kansas. He joined the Louisiana State University Department of Public Administration in 2009 and became chair in 2015. He became the ninth dean of the E. J. Ourso College of Business on November 1, 2020. In March 2022, Llorens was appointed by President Joe Biden to serve as a member of the Federal Salary Council.

References 

Living people
People from Baton Rouge, Louisiana
Loyola University New Orleans alumni
University of Texas at Austin alumni
University of Georgia alumni
United States Department of Labor officials
Biden administration personnel
University of Kansas faculty
Louisiana State University faculty
Year of birth missing (living people)